The Oxnard Transit Center, originally known as the Oxnard Transportation Center, is an intermodal transit center in historic downtown Oxnard, California. As a transit hub, the station serves Amtrak and Metrolink trains as well as local and regional buses. Amtrak's Pacific Surfliner from San Luis Obispo to San Diego, Amtrak's Coast Starlight from Los Angeles to Seattle, Washington, and Metrolink's Ventura County Line from Los Angeles Union Station to East Ventura stop here. 

 Amtrak's Coast Starlight serves the station with one train daily in each direction.

Of the 74 California stations served by Amtrak, Oxnard was the 28th-busiest in FY2012, boarding or detraining an average of approximately 223 passengers daily.

History 
The Southern Pacific Railroad constructed a wye at Montalvo in late 1897 on the original route connecting Ventura to Los Angeles through the Santa Clara River Valley. This spur was needed for shipping construction equipment to the site of a new beet sugar refinery. A wooden railroad trestle and rail line were constructed over the Santa Clara River as the spur headed south, reaching the new settlement here on the relatively isolated coastal plain in April 1898. The rail line turned here from the north–south alignment to east–west towards Camarillo as they continued building the towards Santa Susana in the Simi Valley. With the completion of the Santa Susana Tunnel connecting the line to Burbank, this became the most direct route between Los Angeles and San Francisco. The new settlement was named after the factory owner and in 1904 traffic on the coast railroad line was rerouted through Oxnard. 

In 1987, the current station was constructed on the northerly end of the curve while the former station remained at the southerly end. The former Oxnard depot has continued in use as a maintenance and freight yard office by Union Pacific.

Metrolink service started on April 4, 1994, after the Northridge earthquake damaged Simi Valley Freeway and the Federal Emergency Management Agency agreed to temporarily fund the extension of service. The trains were stored overnight in a temporary layover facility in the Montalvo neighborhood of Ventura where the Santa Paula Branch Line, owned by the Ventura County Transportation Commission, connects to the Coast Line.

The station was formerly on State Route 1 but in 2014, Oxnard Boulevard was relinquished to the city in anticipation of a bypass route east of the Oxnard that would meet US 101 at the rebuilt interchange at Rice Avenue. A Rice Avenue overpass that would take the rerouted State Route 1 over the rail line has long been proposed at the site where the accident occurred. The new overpass would include an interchange with State Route 34 (known as 5th Street for most of the route) that parallels the rail line to Camarillo.

Notable places nearby
The station is within walking distance of the following notable places: 
 Carnegie Art Museum
 Henry T. Oxnard Historic District

References

External links 

Amtrak stations in Ventura County, California
Buildings and structures in Oxnard, California
Bus stations in Ventura County, California
Metrolink stations in Ventura County, California
Railway stations in the United States opened in 1987
Transit centers in the United States
Transportation in Oxnard, California